The Battle of Arafura Sea, also known as the Battle of Vlakke Hoek, was a naval battle in the Vlakke Hoek Bay (Etna Bay) of the Arafura Sea in Western New Guinea on January 15, 1962, between Indonesia and the Netherlands.

The battle stopped an attempt by the Indonesian Navy to land 150 soldiers in Kaimana in Dutch New Guinea for sabotage and to incite the local population against the Dutch government. Commodore Yos Sudarso was in charge of the operation at sea, while Colonel Murshid commanded the infiltrators. Three Indonesian torpedo boats left the Aru Islands in the middle of the night but were intercepted near the New Guinea coast by a Dutch Neptune reconnaissance plane, as the Dutch had anticipated the action for weeks. The torpedo boats responded to the flares sent off by the plane by shooting at it. The Dutch destroyer HNLMS Evertsen then joined the scene and sank RI Matjan Tutul, commanded by Sudarso. The other two ships, RI Matjan Kumbang and RI Harimau, fled, but one hit a reef and the other was hit by gunfire and disabled. Evertsen was able to save most of the crew of Matjan Tutul, but at least three sailors died, among whom was Commodore Sudarso.

The Indonesian action itself was an abject failure and General Nasution even refused to relay the bad news to President Sukarno, forcing Colonel Murshid to do this in person. However, the small battle was partially responsible for the subsequent involvement of the Soviet Union and United States in the Western New Guinea dispute, and it is honored in Indonesia by "Oceanic Duty Day" (Hari Dharma Samudera), an annual nationwide day of remembrance. Twelve years after his death, Yos Sudarso was officially added to the register of Indonesian heroes of the Revolution, while RI Harimau was made into a monument at the Purna Bhakti Pertiwi Museum in Taman Mini Indonesia Indah.

References

Further reading

External links
 The Dutch New Guinea Dispute - Operation Trikora 1961-1962
 The Dutch New Guinea Dispute 1949-1962

1962 in Indonesia
Naval battles involving the Netherlands
Naval battles post-1945
Battles involving Indonesia
Conflicts in 1962
Netherlands New Guinea
Indonesia–Netherlands relations
January 1962 events in Asia